Cyrus Edward Swartwood (January 12, 1859 – May 15, 1924) was an American professional baseball player and umpire. He played all or part of nine seasons in Major League Baseball, primarily as a right fielder and first baseman. Swartwood played for the Buffalo Bisons (1881), Pittsburgh Alleghenys/Pirates (1882–84, 1892), Brooklyn Grays (1885–87), and Toledo Maumees (1890).

In 1882, Swartwood led the American Association in runs (87), doubles (18), and total bases (161). He was the league batting champion in 1883 with a .357 average and also led the league in hits (147) and OPS+ (188). Swartwood finished in the top 10 in many offensive categories during his career, including batting average (three times), on-base percentage (five times), slugging percentage (three times), and bases on balls (six times).

Swartwood's MLB career totals included 725 games played, a .300 batting average, 863 hits, 14 home runs, and 608 runs scored. He played in the minor leagues until 1893. After his playing career was over, Swartwood became an umpire. He umpired in the majors in 1894 and then from 1898 through 1900, totaling 429 games.

Swartwood died at the age of 65 in Pittsburgh, Pennsylvania, and is interred at Union Dale Cemetery in that city.

See also
 List of Major League Baseball batting champions
 List of Major League Baseball annual doubles leaders
 List of Major League Baseball annual runs scored leaders

References

External links

Retrosheet

1859 births
1924 deaths
19th-century baseball players
Major League Baseball right fielders
Buffalo Bisons (NL) players
Pittsburgh Alleghenys players
Brooklyn Grays players
Toledo Maumees players
Pittsburgh Pirates players
Hamilton Hams players
Sioux City Corn Huskers players
Providence Grays (minor league) players
Rochester Flour Cities players
Providence Clamdiggers (baseball) players
Major League Baseball umpires
Baseball players from Illinois
Sportspeople from Rockford, Illinois